The Scandinavian Logic Society, abbreviated as SLS, is a not-for-profit organization with objective to organize, promote, and support logic-related events and other activities of relevance for the development of logic-related research and education in the Nordic Region of Europe.

The society is a member of the Division of Logic, Methodology and Philosophy of Science and Technology.

History 
The SLS was founded on 20 August 2012, at the 8th Scandinavian Logic Symposium in Roskilde, Denmark. Today the society has its seat in Stockholm, Sweden. It unites academics from Denmark, Finland, Iceland, Norway and Sweden working primarily on theory and applications of logic to computer science, philosophy, mathematics and linguistics.

Presidents 
The SLS is led by Executive Committee.

The presidents of the SLS:

 2012-2017 Dag Normann
 2017–present Valentin Goranko

Main activities

Scandinavian Logic Symposium (SLSS) 
The Society organizes regular Scandinavian Logic Symposia (SLSS) every 2–4 years on a geographically rotating principle. The primary aim of the Symposium is to promote research in the field of logic (broadly conceived) carried out in research communities in Scandinavia.

Past symposia 

 1968:     1st symposium in Åbo/Turku, Finland
 1971:     2nd symposium in Oslo, Norway
 1973:     3rd symposium in Uppsala, Sweden
 1976:     4th symposium in Jyväskylä, Finland
 1979:     5th symposium in Aalborg, Denmark
 1982:     6th symposium in Telemark, Norway
 1996:     7th symposium in Uppsala, Sweden
 2012:     8th symposium in Roskilde, Denmark
 2014:     9th symposium in Tampere, Finland
 2018:     10th symposium in Gothenburg, Sweden
 2022:     11th symposium in Bergen, Norway
11th symposium scheduled for 2020 in Bergen, Norway, was postponed for 2022 due to pandemic of COVID-19

Nordic Logic (Summer) School (NLS) 
The Society organizes regular Nordic Logic Schools every 2–4 years. The intended audience is advanced master students, PhD-students, postdocs and experienced researchers wishing to learn the state of the art in a particular subject.

Past schools 

 2013:     1st summer school in Nordfjordeid, Norway
 2015:     2nd summer school in Helsinki, Finland
 2017:     3rd summer school in Stockholm, Sweden
 2022:     4th summer school in Bergen, Norway

4th summer school scheduled for 2020 in Bergen, Norway, was postponed for 2022 due to pandemic of COVID-19

General meetings of the SLS 
General meetings of the Society are held regularly during the Scandinavian Logic Symposium.

Membership 
Membership in the SLS is open to all interested persons who agree with and support the objectives of the Society.

See also 

 International Union of History and Philosophy of Science
 Association for Symbolic Logic
 World Logic Day
 Thoralf Skolem

References

External links 

 SLS official website
 Icelandic Center of Excellence in Theoretical Computer Science (ICE-TCS)
 Copenhagen Association for Dynamics, Interaction, Logic, Language and Computation (CADILLAC)
 Bergen Logic Group
 The Logic and Artificial Intelligence (LAI) group, Bergen University
 The Skolem Lecture
 CLLAM – Centre for Logic, Language, and Mind
 The Stockholm Logic Seminar

Mathematical logic organizations
Philosophical logic
Philosophy organizations
Organizations established in 2012
Organizations based in Sweden
Logic organizations
2012 establishments in Sweden